is a tram stop on the Tokyo Sakura Tram.

Lines
Sakaecho Station is served by the Tokyo Sakura Tram.